RFC Märjamaa is an Estonian rugby club based in the borough of Märjamaa.

History
The club was founded in 2009.

References

Estonian rugby union teams
Rugby clubs established in 2009
Märjamaa Parish